Doug Flutie's Maximum Football 2020 is a gridiron football video game developed and published by Canuck Play. It is the sequel to Maximum Football 2019 and the predecesor to Maximum Football (2023). The game was released on September 25, 2020, for PlayStation 4, and Xbox One.

Sequel

On February 7, 2022, publisher Modus Games announced plans to release their next sequel Maximum Football 2023 as a free-to-play title which is also under development by Invictus Games. The sim is currently being built in Unreal Engine 5 and is planned to by released on PC, PS4, PS5, Xbox One, and Xbox Series platforms on an unspecified date. However, Steam players can expect the game to enter early access sometime this spring.

References

2020 video games
American football video games
Canadian football video games
PlayStation 4 games
Xbox One games
Video games developed in Canada
Video games set in Canada
Maximum Games games
Multiplayer and single-player video games